is a women's volleyball team owned by Japan Tobacco Ltd., and based in Nishinomiya, Hyogo, Japan. The team is the reigning champion of the V.League 1 after winning the 2019-20 and 2020–21 seasons.

Honours

Domestic competitions
Japan Volleyball League/V.League/V.Premier League/V.LEAGUE Division 1
 Champion (3): 2010-11, 2019-20, 2020-21
 Runners-up (4): 2006-07, 2009–10, 2017–18, 2021-22
 

Business League/V1 League/V.Challenge League/V.Challenge League I/V.LEAGUE Division 2
 Champion (4): 1998–99, 2002–03, 2014–15, 2015–16
 Runners-up (1): 1995–96

Kurowashiki All Japan Volleyball Championship
 Champion (5): 2011, 2012, 2015, 2016, 2018
 Runners-up (5): 2003, 2004, 2007, 2008, 2010

Empress's Cup
 Champion (1): 2020

International competitions
 Asian Championship 1 appearance 
 2010 —   Third place

League results

Current squad
2021-2022 Squad as of 15 June 2021 

 Head coach:  Tomoko Yoshihara

Notable players

Domestic players

 Naomi Eto
 Junko Moriyama
 Chikako Kumamae
 Kaoru Sugayama
 Makiko Horai 
 Seiko Kawamura 
 Yoko Senno
 Miyabi Kubo
 Shoko Kosake
 Ritsuko Endo
 Chika Kamimoto
 Yuki Nishiyama
 Rie Takaki (2003–2011)
 Asami Kawahara
 Yuki Kawai (2008–2011)
 Maiko Sakashita
 Chihiro Kato 
 Yoshie Takeshita (2002–2012)
 Masami Taniguchi
 Ai Yamamoto/Ai Ōtomo (2009–2013)
 Chie Yoshizawa
 Keiki Nishiyama
 Yuki Ishikawa
 Naoko Hashimoto
 Mai Okumura (ja) (2012–2018)
 Megumi Kurihara (2018-2019)
 Misaki Tanaka (2013–2020)
 Anna Ogawa (2013–2021)

Foreign players

 Tatiana Alves Dos Santos (2008–2009)

 Eva Yaneva (2012–2013)

 Kenny Moreno Pino (2006–2008)

 Jovana Brakočević (2011–2012)
 Brankica Mihajlović (2017–2019)

 Yeon-Koung Kim (2009–2011)

 Onuma Sittirak (2014–2017)
 Kaewkalaya Kamulthala (2018–2020)
 Thatdao Nuekjang (2020-)

 Dilara Bilge (2013-2014)

 Andrea Drews (2019-2022)
 Karsta Lowe (2019-2022)

References 

Japanese volleyball teams
Volleyball clubs established in 1956
1956 establishments in Japan
Sports teams in Hyōgo Prefecture
Japan Tobacco